Peter Donnelly is an artist based in Christchurch, New Zealand who has raked over 1000 works into the New Brighton sands.

References
 
 
 Pictures of his work can be found at https://www.flickr.com/groups/1535062@N22/

External links
 Force Five Films profile: Sand Dancer

New Zealand artists
Artists from Christchurch
Living people
Year of birth missing (living people)